Benjamin James Aronov (October 16, 1932 – May 3, 2015) was an American jazz pianist, professionally known as Ben Aronov or Benny Aronov.

Career 
Aronov was born in Gary, Indiana. He played in local jazz and dance ensembles as a teenager in Tulsa, Oklahoma. He was a student at the University of Tulsa in 1951 and 1952, then was conscripted into the United States Army and was stationed in Texas, where he played in a military band. After leaving the Army, he attended the Manhattan School of Music, earning a bachelor's degree in music in 1966.

Career 
In 1954, Aronov moved to Los Angeles and began playing at the Lighthouse and with Terry Gibbs, June Christy, and Lena Horne. In 1961, he moved to New York City. He worked with Al Cohn, Benny Goodman, Jim Hall, Morgana King, Lee Konitz, Peggy Lee, Liza Minnelli, George Mraz, Mark Murphy, the National Jazz Ensemble, Ken Peplowski, Tom Pierson, Zoot Sims, Carol Sloane, and Warren Vaché Jr. He played piano in the Broadway production of Cats from 1982 to 2000. After this, he moved to Aix-en-Provence, where he remained until his death in 2015.

References
Footnotes

General references
Gary W. Kennedy, "Ben Aronov". The New Grove Dictionary of Jazz. 2nd edition, ed. Barry Kernfeld.

American jazz pianists
American male pianists
Musicians from Indiana
1932 births
2015 deaths
American emigrants to France
American male jazz musicians
Arbors Records artists
People from Tulsa, Oklahoma
Musicians from Tulsa, Oklahoma
People from Gary, Indiana
Musicians from Gary, Indiana
Manhattan School of Music alumni